Selo is a former village in central Slovenia in the Municipality of Lukovica. It is now part of the village of Lukovica pri Domžalah. It is part of the traditional region of Upper Carniola and is now included in the Central Slovenia Statistical Region.

Geography
Selo is a small roadside settlement between Šentvid pri Lukovici and Lukovica pri Domžalah.

Name
The name Selo is derived from the Slovene common noun selo 'village, settlement'.

History
Selo was annexed by Lukovica pri Domžalah in 1953, ending its existence as a separate settlement.

Notable people
Notable people that were born or lived in Selo include:
Dragotin Lončar (1876–1954), historian, editor, and politician

References

External links
 
Selo on Geopedia

Populated places in the Municipality of Lukovica
Former settlements in Slovenia